Visscher is a Dutch occupational surname. Visscher is an archaic spelling of Dutch visser meaning "fisherman". Varianta are Visschers and  De Visscher. The latter form is now most common in East Flanders. Notable people with the surname include:

 Roemer Visscher (1547–1620), merchant and writer from Amsterdam
 Anna Visscher (1584–1651), Dutch artist, poet, and translator, daughter of Roemer
 Maria Tesselschade Visscher (1594–1649), Dutch poet, and engraver, daughter of Roemer
 Claes Jansz. Visscher (1587–1652), engraver and publisher from Amsterdam
 Nicolaes Visscher I (1618–1679), his son, Dutch cartographer and publisher
 Nicolaes Visscher II (1649–1702), his son, Dutch cartographer and publisher
 Frans Jacobszoon Visscher (fl.1623–1645), Dutch mariner and explorer; variants of his first name include Franchoijs or Franchoys etc; his middle name is sometimes abbreviated "Jacobsz." 
 Three brothers (de) Visscher of Haarlem:
 Cornelis Visscher (1628/29 – 1658), Dutch engraver
 Lambert Visscher (1633 – aft.1690), Dutch printmaker active in Italy
 Jan de Visscher (1635/36 – aft.1692), Dutch engraver and painter
  (1835–1912), Dutch translator and writer
  (1864–1947), Dutch theologian and politician
 John Paul Visscher (1895–1950), American protozoologist
 Jantje Visscher (born 1933), American painter, photographer, and sculptor
  (born 1960), Dutch comedian and cabaret performer
 Maurice Visscher (1901–1983), American physiologist
 Peter Visscher, Dutch-born Australian geneticist
Visschers
 Jacques Visschers (born 1940), Dutch footballer
De Visscher
 Charles De Visscher (1884–1973), Belgian jurist
  (1885–1964), Belgian legal historian
  (1916–1996), Belgian jurist, son of Charles
 Jeffrey de Visscher (born 1981), Dutch footballer
 William Lightfoot Visscher (1842-1924), poet & newspaperman in Washington State

See also
 Visscher Island, Tasmania, named after Frans Jacobszoon Visscher
 Visscher panorama, an engraving of London by Claes Visscher 
 Visser, Dutch surname of the same origin
 Vischer, German surname of the same origin

References

Dutch-language surnames
Occupational surnames

de:Visscher
fr:Visscher
it:Visscher
ru:Виссхер